Liaoxi was a former province in Northeast China, located in what is now part of Liaoning and Jilin provinces. It existed from 1949 to 1954, and its capital was Jinzhou.

Administrative division

References 

Former provinces of China
1954 disestablishments in China
1949 establishments in China
History of Liaoning
History of Jilin
States and territories established in 1949